The Triennial E. A. Lowe Lectures are an ongoing series of lectures held at Corpus Christi College, University of Oxford, in memory of the noted palaeographer E. A. Lowe who was an Honorary Fellow of the College from 1954 until his death in 1969. They are delivered by prominent palaeographers, with each scholar giving a trio of lectures on a topic within the field. Oxford University Press sometimes publishes revised versions of the lectures. Lecturers have included N. G. Wilson, A. C. de la Mare, Anthony Grafton, and Michael Lapidge.

Lectures
 2023 — Niels Gaul: Manuscripts of Character: Codex, Ethos, and Authority in Byzantium and Beyond 
 Lecture 1 (28 Feb 2023): “Codex” – explored the phenomenon of Byzantine literati curating their own writings in codex format and possible ancient and patristic models; with glances at similar practices in other medieval manuscript cultures 
 Lecture 2 (2 Mar 2023): “Ethos” – examined the ways in which such codices were thought to display the author's character, and what the concept entailed in this context
 Lecture 3 (7 Mar 2023): “Authority” – related expressions of authorial ethos to matters of mise-en-page, with particular attention to marginal spaces 
 2020 — Judith Schlanger: The Hebrew-Latin Manuscripts of the Library of Corpus Christi College 
 Lecture 1 (25 Feb 2020): “Two nations in their mother's womb” – Hebrew-Latin manuscripts, their materiality and their purpose 
 Lecture 2 (27 Feb 2020): “Take the garment of a Jew” – bilingual manuscripts, their glosses and their Jewish background 
 Lecture 3 (3 Mar 2020): From “superscriptio Lincolniensis” to Prior Gregory – the difficult question of manuscripts’ provenance 
 2017 — Rodney Thomson: The Fox and the Bees: the First Century of the Library of Corpus Christi College 
 Lecture 1 (22 Feb 2017): The Founder as Shaping Force: Richard Fox and his Books
 Lecture 2 (24 Feb 2017): The First President as Fox's Instrument: John Claymond’s Donations
 Lecture 3 (27 Feb 2017): The Library They Produced
 2014 — Erik Kwakkel: The Birth of Gothic Script
 Lecture 1 (21 Feb 2014): The Evolution from Caroline Minuscule to Gothic Textualis
 Lecture 2 (25 Feb 2014): Regional Variety
 Lecture 3 (27 Feb 2014): Adopting a New Script
 2011 — David Ganz: Latin Manuscript Books Prior to the Ninth Century: Ways of Using Codices Latini Antiquiores
 Lecture 1 (9 May 2011): Evaluating the Evidence
 Lecture 2 (16 May 2011): Scribes and their Patrons
 Lecture 3 (23 May 2011): Half-Uncial Scripts
 2008 — Susan Rankin: Impressed on the Memory: Musical Sounds and Notations in the Ninth Century
 Lecture 1 (26 Feb 2008): Case Study One: The Abbey of St Gall
 Lecture 2 (28 Feb 2008): Case Study Two: The Cathedral of Laon
 Lecture 3 (6 Mar 2008): Musical Notation as a Carolingian Phenomenon
 2005 — Virginia Brown: Beneventan Script and the Culture of Medieval Southern Italy
 Lecture 1 (22 Feb 2005): E.A. Lowe and the Making of The Beneventan Script
 Lecture 2 (24 Feb 2005): In the Shadow of Montecassino: Beneventan Writing Centres in the Abruzzi
 Lecture 3 (1 Mar 2005): Across the Adriatic: Beneventan Scriptoria in Dalmatia
 2002 — Michael Lapidge: The Anglo-Saxon Library
 Lecture 1 (24 Jan 2002): Vanished Libraries
 Lecture 2 (31 Jan 2002): Reconstructing Anglo-Saxon Libraries: The Evidence of Manuscripts
 Lecture 3 (7 Feb 2002): Reconstructing Anglo-Saxon Libraries: The Evidence of Citations
 1999 — Michael Reeve: Manuscripts and Method: The Transmission of Vegetius
 Lecture 1 (25 Jan 1999): A Proposal about Modestus
 Lecture 2 (1 Feb 1999): A Man on a Horse
 Lecture 3 (8 Feb 1999): R.
 1996 — Anthony Grafton: Ancient History in Early Modern Europe
 Lecture 1 (24 Jan 1996): The Reading and Teaching of the Ancient Historians
 Lecture 2 (26 Jan 1996): The Antiquarians and the Reconstruction of Ancient Societies
 Lecture 3 (29 Jan 1996): The Rediscovery of Barbarian Texts and Civilisations

References

See also
 Lyell Lectures
 McKenzie Lectures
 Panizzi Lectures
 Sandars Lectures

Bibliography
History of books
Lowe
Palaeography
Textual scholarship